Jessica Turnbull (born 23 June 1995) is an Australian female squash player. She earned her career best ranking of 69 in July 2018. Jessica was also part of the 2017 PSA World Tour.

References 

1995 births
Living people
Australian female squash players
Competitors at the 2017 World Games
21st-century Australian women
Competitors at the 2022 World Games